Dmitriyevsky (masculine), Dmitriyevskaya (feminine), or Dmitriyevskoye (neuter) is the name of several rural localities in Russia.

Republic of Adygea
As of 2010, one rural locality in the Republic of Adygea bears this name:
Dmitriyevsky, Republic of Adygea, a khutor in Koshekhablsky District

Arkhangelsk Oblast
As of 2010, three rural localities in Arkhangelsk Oblast bear this name:
Dmitriyevskaya, Krasnoborsky District, Arkhangelsk Oblast, a village in Cherevkovsky Selsoviet of Krasnoborsky District
Dmitriyevskaya, Shenkursky District, Arkhangelsk Oblast, a village in Fedorogorsky Selsoviet of Shenkursky District
Dmitriyevskaya, Verkhnetoyemsky District, Arkhangelsk Oblast, a village in Fedkovsky Selsoviet of Verkhnetoyemsky District

Ivanovo Oblast
As of 2010, two rural localities in Ivanovo Oblast bear this name:
Dmitriyevskoye, Komsomolsky District, Ivanovo Oblast, a selo in Komsomolsky District
Dmitriyevskoye, Zavolzhsky District, Ivanovo Oblast, a village in Zavolzhsky District

Kaluga Oblast
As of 2010, one rural locality in Kaluga Oblast bears this name:
Dmitriyevskoye, Kaluga Oblast, a village in Maloyaroslavetsky District

Kirov Oblast
As of 2010, one rural locality in Kirov Oblast bears this name:
Dmitriyevskaya, Kirov Oblast, a village in Ichetovkinsky Rural Okrug of Afanasyevsky District

Kostroma Oblast
As of 2010, two rural localities in Kostroma Oblast bear this name:
Dmitriyevskoye, Buysky District, Kostroma Oblast, a village in Tsentralnoye Settlement of Buysky District
Dmitriyevskoye, Galichsky District, Kostroma Oblast, a village in Dmitriyevskoye Settlement of Galichsky District

Krasnodar Krai
As of 2010, one rural locality in Krasnodar Krai bears this name:
Dmitriyevskaya, Krasnodar Krai, a stanitsa in Dmitriyevsky Rural Okrug of Kavkazsky District

Kursk Oblast
As of 2010, one rural locality in Kursk Oblast bears this name:
Dmitriyevsky, Kursk Oblast, a settlement in Krivtsovsky Selsoviet of Shchigrovsky District

Moscow Oblast
As of 2010, one rural locality in Moscow Oblast bears this name:
Dmitriyevsky, Moscow Oblast, a settlement in Uspenskoye Rural Settlement of Serebryano-Prudsky District

Nizhny Novgorod Oblast
As of 2010, two rural localities in Nizhny Novgorod Oblast bear this name:
Dmitriyevskoye, Krasnobakovsky District, Nizhny Novgorod Oblast, a selo under the administrative jurisdiction of the work settlement of Vetluzhsky, Krasnobakovsky District
Dmitriyevskoye, Sokolsky District, Nizhny Novgorod Oblast, a selo in Volzhsky Selsoviet of Sokolsky District

Novosibirsk Oblast
As of 2010, one rural locality in Novosibirsk Oblast bears this name:
Dmitriyevsky, Novosibirsk Oblast, a settlement in Kuybyshevsky District

Oryol Oblast
As of 2010, two rural localities in Oryol Oblast bear this name:
Dmitriyevsky, Livensky District, Oryol Oblast, a settlement in Navesnensky Selsoviet of Livensky District
Dmitriyevsky, Mtsensky District, Oryol Oblast, a settlement in Vysokinsky Selsoviet of Mtsensky District

Penza Oblast
As of 2010, one rural locality in Penza Oblast bears this name:
Dmitriyevsky, Penza Oblast, a settlement in Virginsky Selsoviet of Nizhnelomovsky District

Perm Krai
As of 2010, one rural locality in Perm Krai bears this name:
Dmitriyevskoye, Perm Krai, a selo in Ilyinsky District

Ryazan Oblast
As of 2010, one rural locality in Ryazan Oblast bears this name:
Dmitriyevsky, Ryazan Oblast, a settlement in Zhmurovsky Rural Okrug of Mikhaylovsky District

Stavropol Krai
As of 2010, one rural locality in Stavropol Krai bears this name:
Dmitriyevskoye, Stavropol Krai, a selo in Krasnogvardeysky District

Tula Oblast
As of 2010, one rural locality in Tula Oblast bears this name:
Dmitriyevskoye, Tula Oblast, a selo in Dmitriyevsky Rural Okrug of Zaoksky District

Vladimir Oblast
As of 2010, one rural locality in Vladimir Oblast bears this name:
Dmitriyevskoye, Vladimir Oblast, a village in Kovrovsky District

Vologda Oblast
As of 2010, six rural localities in Vologda Oblast bear this name:
Dmitriyevskoye, Dmitriyevsky Selsoviet, Cherepovetsky District, Vologda Oblast, a selo in Dmitriyevsky Selsoviet of Cherepovetsky District
Dmitriyevskoye, Surkovsky Selsoviet, Cherepovetsky District, Vologda Oblast, a selo in Surkovsky Selsoviet of Cherepovetsky District
Dmitriyevskoye, Gryazovetsky District, Vologda Oblast, a selo in Minkinsky Selsoviet of Gryazovetsky District
Dmitriyevskoye, Novlensky Selsoviet, Vologodsky District, Vologda Oblast, a village in Novlensky Selsoviet of Vologodsky District
Dmitriyevskoye, Spassky Selsoviet, Vologodsky District, Vologda Oblast, a village in Spassky Selsoviet of Vologodsky District
Dmitriyevskaya, Vologda Oblast, a village in Verkhneramensky Selsoviet of Ust-Kubinsky District

Voronezh Oblast
As of 2010, one rural locality in Voronezh Oblast bears this name:
Dmitriyevsky, Voronezh Oblast, a khutor in Ostryanskoye Rural Settlement of Nizhnedevitsky District

Yaroslavl Oblast
As of 2010, seven rural localities in Yaroslavl Oblast bear this name:
Dmitriyevskoye, Dmitriyevsky Rural Okrug, Danilovsky District, Yaroslavl Oblast, a selo in Dmitriyevsky Rural Okrug of Danilovsky District
Dmitriyevskoye, Semlovsky Rural Okrug, Danilovsky District, Yaroslavl Oblast, a village in Semlovsky Rural Okrug of Danilovsky District
Dmitriyevskoye, Pereslavsky District, Yaroslavl Oblast, a selo in Dmitriyevsky Rural Okrug of Pereslavsky District
Dmitriyevskoye, Poshekhonsky District, Yaroslavl Oblast, a selo in Oktyabrsky Rural Okrug of Poshekhonsky District
Dmitriyevskoye, Tutayevsky District, Yaroslavl Oblast, a village in Rodionovsky Rural Okrug of Tutayevsky District
Dmitriyevskoye, Glebovsky Rural Okrug, Yaroslavsky District, Yaroslavl Oblast, a village in Glebovsky Rural Okrug of Yaroslavsky District
Dmitriyevskoye, Mordvinovsky Rural Okrug, Yaroslavsky District, Yaroslavl Oblast, a selo in Mordvinovsky Rural Okrug of Yaroslavsky District